Beau Christian Allen (born November 14, 1991) is a former American football nose tackle. He was drafted by the Philadelphia Eagles in the seventh round of the 2014 NFL Draft. He played college football at Wisconsin.

High school career
Beau attended Minnetonka High School, graduating in 2010. He was the only Minnetonka student in history to start all four years under coach Dave Nelson. He was ranked 5th in the state by the website Rivals. He was recruited by Notre Dame, Stanford, Michigan, UCLA, amongst others. He ultimately chose Wisconsin as that is the alma mater of his parents.

College career
In his last three years at Wisconsin, Allen had eight sacks and 15 tackles for loss.

Professional career

Philadelphia Eagles

Allen was drafted in the seventh round (224th overall) of the 2014 NFL Draft by the Philadelphia Eagles. On May 15, 2014, he signed a four-year deal with the Eagles. As a rookie in 2014, Allen played all 16 games with 10 tackles and half a sack. In 2015, he played 16 games with 2 starts, finishing the year with 28 tackles and 2 passes defended.

On September 11, 2016, Allen entered a game against the Cleveland Browns on offense, lining up as the team's fullback.  The Eagles were able to score a touchdown behind Allen's blocking. Beau finished the 2016 year with 29 tackles and 0.5 sacks.

On April 8, 2017, it was reported that Allen had suffered a pectoral injury that required 4–6 weeks to recover. Allen had 20 tackles and 1 sack for his 2017 season. Allen recorded 2 tackles in Super Bowl LII and beat the New England Patriots 41-33.

Tampa Bay Buccaneers
On March 15, 2018, Allen signed a three-year contract worth an estimated $15 million with the Tampa Bay Buccaneers. In 13 games, he had 10 tackles and 0.5 sacks.

New England Patriots
On March 20, 2020, Allen signed a two-year deal worth up to $8 million with the New England Patriots. He was placed on injured reserve on September 7, 2020. He was designated to return from injured reserve on October 21, and began practicing with the team again; however, after he suffered an injury in practice, the Patriots declined to activate him after his 21-day practice period expired, and he was ruled out for the rest of the season. Allen was released after the season on March 18, 2021.

Allen announced his retirement on July 1, 2022.

References

1991 births
Living people
American football defensive tackles
New England Patriots players
People from Minnetonka, Minnesota
Philadelphia Eagles players
Players of American football from Minnesota
Sportspeople from the Minneapolis–Saint Paul metropolitan area
Tampa Bay Buccaneers players
Wisconsin Badgers football players